Surya Singh Besra is a political activist and prominent political leader. He is the founder secretary of All Jharkhand Students Union (AJSU) and Jharkhand People's Party (JPP). He is a prominent leader in movement for separate state of Jharkhand. He had also represented Ghatshila constituency as IND MLA in 1990.

References 

Living people
Year of birth missing (living people)
People from East Singhbhum district
Indian National Congress politicians
Jharkhand Mukti Morcha politicians
All Jharkhand Students Union politicians
Bihar MLAs 1985–1990
Bharatiya Janata Party politicians from Jharkhand